Antônio Augusto Monteiro de Barros (1790 – 16 November 1841) was a Brazilian politician who served as a senator in the Empire of Brazil from 1828 to 1841.

References

1790 births
1841 deaths
Members of the Senate of the Empire of Brazil
19th-century Brazilian politicians
University of Coimbra alumni
People from Ponta Delgada